This is a list of flag bearers who have represented Argentina at the Olympics. Flag bearers carry the national flag of their country at the opening ceremony of the Olympic Games.

Key

See also
Argentina at the Olympics

References

Argentina at the Olympics
Argentina
Olympic